10249 Harz, provisional designation , is a background asteroid from the central regions of the asteroid belt, approximately  in diameter. It was discovered on 17 October 1960, by Ingrid and Cornelis van Houten at Leiden, and Tom Gehrels at Palomar Observatory in California, United States. The assumed S-type asteroid is likely elongated and has a short rotation period of 3.63 hours. It was named after the German mountain range Harz.

Orbit and classification 

Harz is a non-family asteroid from the main belt's background population. It orbits the Sun in the central main-belt at a distance of 2.3–2.8 AU once every 4 years and 2 months (1,510 days; semi-major axis of 2.58 AU). Its orbit has an eccentricity of 0.09 and an inclination of 4° with respect to the ecliptic. The body's observation arc begins with its official discovery observation at Palomar in October 1960.

Palomar–Leiden survey 

The survey designation "P-L" stands for Palomar–Leiden, named after Palomar Observatory and Leiden Observatory, which collaborated on the fruitful Palomar–Leiden survey in the 1960s. Gehrels used Palomar's Samuel Oschin telescope (also known as the 48-inch Schmidt Telescope), and shipped the photographic plates to Ingrid and Cornelis van Houten at Leiden Observatory where astrometry was carried out. The trio are credited with the discovery of several thousand asteroid discoveries.

Physical characteristics 

Harz is an assumed S-type asteroid, which agrees with the measured albedo (see below) by the Wide-field Infrared Survey Explorer (WISE).

Rotation period 

In October 2010, and December 2014, two rotational lightcurves of Harz were obtained from photometric observations in the R-band by astronomers at the Palomar Transient Factory in California. Lightcurve analysis gave a rotation period of 3.631 and 3.64 hours with a brightness amplitude of 0.47 and 0.52 magnitude, respectively, indicating that the body has an elongated shape.

Diameter and albedo 

According to the survey carried out by the NEOWISE mission of NASA's WISE telescope, Harz measures between 3.59 kilometers in diameter and its surface has an albedo of 0.26, while the Collaborative Asteroid Lightcurve Link assumes a standard albedo for stony asteroids of 0.20 and calculates a diameter of 3.15 kilometers based on an absolute magnitude of 14.88.

Naming 

This minor planet was named after the Harz mountains, an old German mountain range where silver was mined until the last century. Legend has it that the witches gathered on their broomsticks on a plateau in the Harz mountains on the first day of May. The legendary place where the witches danced is known as Hexentanzplatz. The official naming citation was published by the Minor Planet Center on 1 May 2003.

References

External links 
 Asteroid Lightcurve Database (LCDB), query form (info )
 Dictionary of Minor Planet Names, Google books
 Discovery Circumstances: Numbered Minor Planets (10001)-(15000) – Minor Planet Center
 
 

010249
Discoveries by Cornelis Johannes van Houten
Discoveries by Ingrid van Houten-Groeneveld
Discoveries by Tom Gehrels
9515
Named minor planets
19601017